The Emirates Academy of Hospitality Management (EAHM) in Dubai is the first and only home-grown hospitality management university in the Middle East. The university is part of the Jumeirah Group and Dubai Holding which holds iconic hotels such as the Burj Al Arab,Jumeirah Beach Hotel, and the Madinat Jumeirah heritage and leisure complex. EAHM offers undergraduate and postgraduate levels programmes along with short courses and Executive programmes.  

The EAHM is a preeminent center of innovation and research in the field of tourism and hospitality, with a distinguished reputation as a leader in the Middle East. Its commitment to advancing knowledge and fostering excellence in the industry has established it as a hub of intellectual activity, attracting talented scholars and industry professionals from around the world.  

Through its cutting-edge research programs, state-of-the-art facilities, and exceptional faculty, the Academy is dedicated to shaping the future of the tourism and hospitality sector and ensuring its continued growth and success.

History 
The EAHM was created as part of the emirate of Dubai strategy to develop hospitality and tourism as a key economic sector in the late 1990s. The campus first opened its doors in October 2001 for the delivery of undergraduate programmes. EAHM formed an academic association with École Hôtelière de Lausanne until 2019. By 2005, EAHM had introduced a postgraduate programme, while the first batch of Bachelors and Associate degree students graduated. In 2021 the EAHM celebrated twenty years of leadership in hospitality management higher education in Dubai and the UAE.  

EAHM is a leading organiser of Hospitality and Tourism conferences and seminars for the academic and professional community (EuroChrie academic conferences in 2008 and 2014, THE-ICE in 2012 and in 2022[1]).

Programmes
The Emirates Academy offers degrees on both undergraduate and postgraduate levels.

Undergraduate Programmes

Bachelor of Business Administration (BBA) in International Hospitality Management[1]

A 3-year triple accredited BBA programme in International Hospitality Management inclusive of a 6-month internship at one of the top brands associated with EAHM. The first year focuses on the basics of hospitality management such as front office and housekeeping to food and beverage, understanding the main operational components. Things move up a gear in the second year of the programme where students will put the technical skills into practice through the internship and deep dive into their chosen electives. The final year involves mastering all the skills needed to run a hospitality business to be ready to take on the world.

Postgraduate Programmes

Master of Business Administration in International Hospitality Management (MBA)

1-year triple accredited MBA programme in International Hospitality Management. The first trimester builds the undergraduate and real-life experiences by diving into managing service operations and deepening the understanding of processes. The second trimester focuses on the electives and the third trimester will teach how to manage human capital and progress to developing and monitoring the corporate strategy. By the end of the programme, students also produce a postgraduate thesis on a topic of their choice.

Continuous Professional Development and Consultancy 
The Professional Training & Development department[2] offers trainning and certifications courses in hospitality management for professionals and for amateurs, such as Financial Management, Wine and Beverage, Food & Beverage and Restaurant Management, Customer Service, Marketing, Operations Management, Project Management or Human Resources. Several courses are offering international recognition such as WSET Global[4] Industry professionals are therefore able to pursue continuing education and obtain internationally recognised certifications. Consultancy services are also provided for private organisations and public institutions in the field of hospitality and tourism management, as well as in hospitality education by the team of experts.

Campus and Facilities 

Located in the prime location of Jumeirah, across the street from the b, the campus is within walking distance to the iconic Burj Al Arab, and the Jumeirah beach . The design structure of the buildings and interiors are inspired by the Arabic architecture of stone work and arabic calligraphy on certain aspects of the interiors such as the chandelier lamps. The idea behind this was to maintain the rich culture of the Islamic architecture in a modern surrounding.

The campus consists of a number of resort-style living facilities for the residents : gym, swimming pool, multi sport and tennis courts, recreation room, prayer rooms, cafes and restaurants. Guest housing option is available as well for external guests affiliated with EAHM or the Jumeirah Group.

Reputation

Accreditations and memberships
All programmes of study are accredited by the UAE Federal Government Quality Assurance Agency for Higher Education (Commission for Academic Accreditation) - Ministry of Education. EAHM is also an accredited member of The International Centre of Excellence in Tourism and Hospitality Education (THE-ICE) in Australia, and of the Institute of Hospitality (IoH) in the United Kingdom. 

EAHM is also affiliated to Association to Advance Collegiate Schools of Business (AACSB), EUHOFA International Association of Hotel Schools and Association for Tourism and Leisure Education and Research (ATLAS) and is also a member of Council of International Schools (CIS). These accreditations and memberships assure that the university satisfies international higher education standards, as well as facilitating credit transfers and degree recognition from international universities.

EAHM is recognized by the China Ministry of Education on its White List and by the Ministry of Education, Saudi Arabia.

Rankings 
EAHM is ranked on Top 50 QS Subject Ranking in World Universities Ranking by subject (Hospitality & Leisure Management), and also one of the Top 10 universities to study Hospitality Management by Educations.com.

See also 
 Education in the United Arab Emirates

References

External links
 Official website

Hospitality schools in the United Arab Emirates
Educational institutions established in 2001
2001 establishments in the United Arab Emirates